Riens du tout (English: Little Nothings) is a 1992 French film directed by Cédric Klapisch and written by him with Jackie Berroyer. Featuring Fabrice Luchini and an ensemble cast, in many often humorous cameos it explores the effects on the staff of a revival plan for a failing department store in Paris.

Plot 
After 100 years, the Grandes Galeries department store in Paris is sinking: staff are listless, customers staying away, and profits vanishing. The board hire Mr Lepetit, giving him one year to turn it round or else it will close. They are in talks with Japanese investors who want the site for a luxury hotel. 

His plan starts with the staff who, he argues, need to believe in themselves, believe in each other, and transmit that belief to customers. A huge programme of activities commences, to build up the individuals and build a team spirit. Human nature being what it is, and the French being who they are, there are difficulties and there are failures. Overall, by the end of the year the remaining staff are well motivated, the store is well thought of, and profits have boomed. 

The board thank Lepetit, sack him, and close the store down. His efforts, and those of all the staff who believed in him, have doubled the price the Japanese are willing to pay.

Cast

 Fabrice Luchini as Lepetit
 Daniel Berlioux as Jacques Martin 
 Marc Berman as Pizzuti 
 Olivier Broche as Lefèvre 
 Antoine Chappey as François 
 Jean-Pierre Darroussin as Domrémy 
 Aurélie Guichard as Vanessa 
 Billy Komg as Mamadou 
 Odette Laure as Madame Yvonne  
 Elisabeth Macocco as Madame Dujardin 
 Marc Maury as Johnny Bonjour 
 Pierre-Olivier Mornas as Roger 
 Jean-Michel Martial as Hubert
 Maïté Nahyr as La directrice de coordination 
 Fred Personne as Monsieur Roi 
 Lucette Raillat as Micheline  
 Eric Forterre as Fred  
 Nathalie Richard as Claire  
 Marie Riva as Zaza  
 Sophie Simon as Pat   
 Zinedine Soualem as Aziz   
 Marina Tomé as Monitrice sourire   
 Karin Viard as Isabelle 
 Coraly Zahonero as Véronique 
 Simon Abkarian as Le danseur grec
 Olivier Rabourdin as Chanteur métro

About the film
In this first film Klapisch's main purpose was to show the difference between the behavior of a person when he is alone and when he is in a group. In order to show this, he filmed the employees during their commute, at work and in other scenes of daily life, which made Klapisch style's reputation. This topic will become recurrent in many of his films.

References

External links

1992 films
1992 comedy films
Films directed by Cédric Klapisch
Films set in Paris
French comedy films
1990s French-language films
1990s French films